Ella Marie Hætta Isaksen (born 25 April 1998) is a Sami musician from Tana, Norway. In 2016 she won the Sámi Grand Prix with her original song Luoddaearru, and in 2017 she won Liet International with the same song. In 2017 Isaksen started the band ISÁK. In October 2018 she won the NRK-show Stjernekamp.

She was the county leader in the environmental protection organization Natur og Ungdom from January 2015 until January 2016. She continued her work in the organization until she was hired as a campaign secretary in Natur og Ungdom in the autumn of 2017. Furthermore, she was elected to the central board of the organization in January 2018, where she sat for six months, until she chose to focus on music in the summer of 2018.

She is the lead vocalist for the Sami electronic-joik band Isák which consists of herself, producer Daniel Eriksen and drummer Aleksander Kostopoulos.

References 

People from Tana, Norway
1998 births
Living people
Norwegian environmentalists
21st-century Norwegian singers
Norwegian Sámi musicians
Norwegian Sámi people
21st-century Norwegian women singers